The 70th edition of the La Flèche Wallonne cycling classic was held on 19 April 2006. It was won by Spanish all-rounder Alejandro Valverde of Caisse d'Epargne–Illes Balears cycling team in a sprint finish.  He was later convicted of doping and banned for two years.

Results

19-04-2006: Charleroi-Huy, 202 km.

External links
Race website
Race map
Cyclingnews.com race page

2006 UCI ProTour
2006
La Fleche